George Benedict Zukerman,  (February 22, 1927 – February 1, 2023) was a Canadian bassoonist and impresario. He was the youngest brother of musicologist Joseph Kerman. As of 2019, he lived with his partner, violinist and teacher Erika Bennedik, in South Surrey, B.C.

Zukerman died on February 1, 2023, at the age of 95.

Awards and recognitions 
In 1992, he was made an Officer of the Order of Canada. In 1995 he received  the Award for Distinguished Contribution to Touring from the Canadian National Arts Centre. In 1996, he was awarded the Order of British Columbia. He was also the recipient of both the Golden Jubilee Medal and the Diamond Jubilee Medal. He was the dedicatee of Australian composer Colin Brumby's bassoon concerto.

References

External links
 Official site

1927 births
2023 deaths
Canadian classical bassoonists
Canadian classical musicians
Members of the Order of British Columbia
Officers of the Order of Canada